The following outline is provided as an overview of and topical guide to Switzerland:

Switzerland –  alpine country in Central Europe, located mostly in the Alps.  Switzerland is the oldest neutral country in the world; it has not fought a foreign war since its neutrality was established by the Treaty of Paris in 1815. It is not a member of the European Union. Swiss cultural icons include Switzerland's quality of life, its neutrality, the Swiss Alps, watches, yodeling, and chocolate.

General reference 

 Pronunciation: 
  
  
  
  
 Common English country name:  Switzerland
 Official English country name:  The Swiss Confederation
 Common endonym(s):  
 Official endonym(s):  
 Adjectival:  Swiss
 Demonym:  Swiss
 Etymology: Name of Switzerland
 International rankings of Switzerland
 ISO country codes:  CH, CHE, 756
 ISO region codes:  See ISO 3166-2:CH
 Internet country code top-level domain:  .ch

Geography of Switzerland 

Geography of Switzerland
 Switzerland is: a landlocked country
 Location:
 Northern Hemisphere and Eastern Hemisphere
 Eurasia
 Europe
 Central Europe
 Western Europe
 Time zone:  Central European Time (UTC+01), Central European Summer Time (UTC+02)
 Geographical centre of Switzerland
 Extreme points of Switzerland
 High:  Monte Rosa 
 Low:  Lake Maggiore 
 Land boundaries:  1,852 km
 740 km
 573 km
 334 km
 164 km
 41 km
 Coastline:  none
 Population of Switzerland: 8,606,000 (2019)  - 99th most populous country
 Area of Switzerland: 41,285 km2
 Atlas of Switzerland

Environment of Switzerland 

Environment of Switzerland
 Environmental movement in Switzerland
 Climate of Switzerland
 Geology of Switzerland
 Hydrology of Switzerland
 Protected areas of Switzerland
 Biosphere reserves in Switzerland
 National parks of Switzerland
 Nature parks in Switzerland
 List of reserves for waterbirds and migratory birds in Switzerland
 Solar power in Switzerland
 Forests of Switzerland
 Wildlife of Switzerland
 Animal welfare and rights in Switzerland
 Fauna of Switzerland
 Birds of Switzerland
 Mammals of Switzerland

Natural geographic features of Switzerland 

 Islands of Switzerland
 Lakes of Switzerland
 Mountain lakes of Switzerland
 Mountains of Switzerland
 Highest mountains of Switzerland
 Glaciers of Switzerland
 Rivers of Switzerland
 Waterfalls of Switzerland
 Valleys of Switzerland
 World Heritage Sites in Switzerland

Regions of Switzerland 

Regions of Switzerland
 Central Switzerland
 Eastern Switzerland
 Espace Mittelland
 Northwestern Switzerland
 Seeland

Ecoregions of Switzerland 

List of ecoregions in Switzerland
 Ecoregions in Switzerland

Administrative divisions of Switzerland 

Administrative divisions of Switzerland
 Subdivisions of Switzerland
 Cantons of Switzerland
 Districts of Switzerland
 Municipalities of Switzerland

Cantons of Switzerland 

Cantons of Switzerland

Districts of Switzerland 

Districts of Switzerland

Municipalities of Switzerland 

Municipalities of Switzerland
 Capital of Switzerland: Berne
 Cities of Switzerland

Demography of Switzerland 

Demographics of Switzerland

Government and politics of Switzerland 

Politics of Switzerland
 Form of government: Federal parliamentary republic, direct democracy.
 Capital of Switzerland: Berne
 Elections in Switzerland
 Political parties in Switzerland
 Swiss neutrality
 Taxation in Switzerland
 Voting in Switzerland
 Electronic voting in Switzerland

Branches of the government of Switzerland 

Government of Switzerland

Executive branch of the government of Switzerland 
 Presiding member of the Federal Council: President of the Swiss Confederation, Alain Berset, for 2018
 Cabinet of Switzerland & collective Head of state: Swiss Federal Council
 Alain Berset (Social Democratic Party of Switzerland), Federal Department of Home Affairs, President of the Federal Council in 2018
 Doris Leuthard (Christian Democratic People's Party of Switzerland), President of the Swiss Confederation for 2017, Federal Department of Environment, Transport, Energy and Communications
 Ueli Maurer (Swiss People's Party), Federal Department of Finance
 Johann Schneider-Ammann (Free Democratic Party of Switzerland), Federal Department of Economic Affairs, Education and Research
 Simonetta Sommaruga (Social Democratic Party of Switzerland), Federal Department of Justice and Police.
 Guy Parmelin (Swiss People's Party), Federal Department of Defence, Civil Protection and Sports
 Ignazio Cassis (Free Democratic Party of Switzerland), The Federal Department of Foreign Affairs

Legislative branch of the government of Switzerland 

 Parliament of Switzerland (bicameral)
 Upper house: Swiss Council of States
 Lower house: National Council of Switzerland

Judicial branch of the government of Switzerland 

Court system of Switzerland
 Supreme Court of Switzerland

Foreign relations of Switzerland 

Foreign relations of Switzerland
 Diplomatic missions in Switzerland
 Diplomatic missions of Switzerland

International organization membership 
The Swiss Confederation is a member of:

African Development Bank Group (AfDB) (nonregional member)
Asian Development Bank (ADB) (nonregional member)
Australia Group
Bank for International Settlements (BIS)
Council of Europe (CE)
Euro-Atlantic Partnership Council (EAPC)
European Bank for Reconstruction and Development (EBRD)
European Free Trade Association (EFTA)
European Organization for Nuclear Research (CERN)
European Space Agency (ESA)
Food and Agriculture Organization (FAO)
Group of Ten (G10)
Inter-American Development Bank (IADB)
International Atomic Energy Agency (IAEA)
International Bank for Reconstruction and Development (IBRD)
International Chamber of Commerce (ICC)
International Civil Aviation Organization (ICAO)
International Criminal Court (ICCt)
International Criminal Police Organization (Interpol)
International Development Association (IDA)
International Energy Agency (IEA)
International Federation of Red Cross and Red Crescent Societies (IFRCS)
International Finance Corporation (IFC)
International Fund for Agricultural Development (IFAD)
International Labour Organization (ILO)
International Maritime Organization (IMO)
International Mobile Satellite Organization (IMSO)
International Monetary Fund (IMF)
International Olympic Committee (IOC)
International Organization for Migration (IOM)
International Organization for Standardization (ISO)
International Red Cross and Red Crescent Movement (ICRM)
International Telecommunication Union (ITU)
International Telecommunications Satellite Organization (ITSO)
International Trade Union Confederation (ITUC)

Inter-Parliamentary Union (IPU)
Latin American Integration Association (LAIA) (observer)
Multilateral Investment Guarantee Agency (MIGA)
Nonaligned Movement (NAM) (guest)
Nuclear Energy Agency (NEA)
Nuclear Suppliers Group (NSG)
Organisation internationale de la Francophonie (OIF)
Organisation for Economic Co-operation and Development (OECD)
Organization for Security and Cooperation in Europe (OSCE)
Organisation for the Prohibition of Chemical Weapons (OPCW)
Organization of American States (OAS) (observer)
Paris Club
Partnership for Peace (PFP)
Permanent Court of Arbitration (PCA)
United Nations (UN)
United Nations Conference on Trade and Development (UNCTAD)
United Nations Educational, Scientific, and Cultural Organization (UNESCO)
United Nations High Commissioner for Refugees (UNHCR)
United Nations Industrial Development Organization (UNIDO)
United Nations Institute for Training and Research (UNITAR)
United Nations Observer Mission in Georgia (UNOMIG)
United Nations Organization Mission in the Democratic Republic of the Congo (MONUC)
United Nations Relief and Works Agency for Palestine Refugees in the Near East (UNRWA)
United Nations Truce Supervision Organization (UNTSO)
Universal Postal Union (UPU)
World Confederation of Labour (WCL)
World Customs Organization (WCO)
World Federation of Trade Unions (WFTU)
World Health Organization (WHO)
World Intellectual Property Organization (WIPO)
World Meteorological Organization (WMO)
World Tourism Organization (UNWTO)
World Trade Organization (WTO)
Zangger Committee (ZC)

Law and order in Switzerland 

Law of Switzerland
 Cannabis in Switzerland
 Capital punishment in Switzerland
 Constitution of Switzerland
 Corruption in Switzerland
 Crime in Switzerland
 Human rights in Switzerland
 LGBT rights in Switzerland
 Freedom of religion in Switzerland
 Internet censorship in Switzerland
 Law enforcement in Switzerland
 Cantonal police
 Gendarmerie
 Municipal police
 Swiss Border Guard

Military of Switzerland 

Swiss Armed Forces
 Command
 Commander-in-chief: André Blattmann, Chief of the Armed Forces
 Ministry of Defence of Switzerland
 Forces
 Swiss Land Forces
 Navy: none, but the Land Forces operate a Lakes flotilla
 Swiss Air Force
 Special Forces Command
 Conscription in Switzerland
 Equipment of the Swiss Armed Forces
 Military ranks of Switzerland

Local government in Switzerland 

Local government in Switzerland

History of Switzerland 

History of Switzerland

 Timeline of Swiss history

History of Switzerland, by period or event 
 Early history of Switzerland
Switzerland in the Roman era
Growth of the Old Swiss Confederacy
French invasion of Switzerland
Switzerland in the Napoleonic era
 Modern history of Switzerland
Switzerland during the World Wars
Bombings of Switzerland in World War II
 Historiography of Switzerland

History of Switzerland, by subject 
 History of Geneva
 History of rail transport in Switzerland
 History of the Swiss Air Force
 Military history of Switzerland

Culture of Switzerland 

Culture of Switzerland
 Architecture of Switzerland
 Buildings and structures in Switzerland above 3000 m
 Cuisine of Switzerland
Swiss cheese
Swiss chocolate
Swiss wine
 Culinary Heritage of Switzerland
 Festivals in Switzerland
 Languages of Switzerland
 Swiss literature
 List of castles and fortresses in Switzerland
 Media in Switzerland
 Newspapers
Newspapers in Switzerland
 Radio
Radio stations in Switzerland
Television in Switzerland
Radiotelevisione svizzera
Radiotelevisiun Svizra Rumantscha
Schweizer Radio und Fernsehen
Télévision Suisse Romande
 National symbols of Switzerland
 Coat of arms of Switzerland
 Flag of Switzerland
 National anthem of Switzerland
 People of Switzerland
 Homelessness in Switzerland
 Immigration to Switzerland
 Prostitution in Switzerland
 Public holidays in Switzerland
 Swiss National Day
 Records of Switzerland
 Religion in Switzerland
 Buddhism in Switzerland
 Hinduism in Switzerland
 Islam in Switzerland
Ahmadiyya in Switzerland
 Judaism in Switzerland
 Protestantism in Switzerland
 Sikhism in Switzerland
 UNESCO World Heritage Sites in Switzerland

Art in Switzerland 
 Art in Switzerland
 Cinema of Switzerland
 Literature of Switzerland
 Music of Switzerland
 Theatre in Switzerland

Sports in Switzerland 

Sport in Switzerland
 Football in Switzerland
 Switzerland at the Olympics

Economy and infrastructure of Switzerland 

Economy of Switzerland
 Economic rank, by nominal GDP (2007): 21st (twenty-first)
 Agriculture in Switzerland
 Banking in Switzerland
 Bank secrecy
 National Bank of Switzerland
 Switzerland Stock Exchange
 Communications in Switzerland
 Internet in Switzerland
 Companies of Switzerland
 Currency of Switzerland:
Banknotes of the Swiss franc
Coins of the Swiss franc
 Energy in Switzerland
Electricity sector in Switzerland
 Energy policy of Switzerland
 Oil industry in Switzerland
 Nuclear power in Switzerland
 Mining in Switzerland
 Science and technology in Switzerland
 Telecommunications in Switzerland
 Telephone numbers in Switzerland
 Tourism in Switzerland
 Transport in Switzerland
 Airports in Switzerland
 Rail transport in Switzerland
Railway companies in Switzerland
 Roads in Switzerland
Motorways of Switzerland
 Waste management in Switzerland
 Water supply and sanitation in Switzerland

Education in Switzerland 

Education in Switzerland
 List of universities in Switzerland

Health in Switzerland 

Health in Switzerland
 Healthcare in Switzerland
 List of hospitals in Switzerland
 Obesity in Switzerland

See also 

Index of Switzerland-related articles
List of Switzerland-related topics
List of international rankings
Member state of the United Nations
Outline of Europe
Outline of geography

References

External links 

Official
The Federal Authorities of the Swiss Confederation
Presence Switzerland
Your Gateway to Switzerland
Swiss Statistics, official website of the Swiss Federal Statistical Office.

Reference
CIA World Factbook - Switzerland

Geography
 
 
 
Federal Office of Topography
searchable interactive map (search.ch)

History
Historical Dictionary of Switzerland 
history-switzerland.geschichte-schweiz.ch

Media
 , a Swiss daily newspaper
Le Temps , a Swiss daily newspaper
Corriere Del Ticino , a Swiss daily newspaper
swissinfo.ch, Swiss News - Worldwide

Education
The Swiss School System
Universities in Switzerland

Science, Research and Technology
The Swiss Portal for Research and Innovation
State Secretariat for Education and Research, SER
The Swiss National Science Foundation
CTI, Commission for Technology and Innovation

Switzerland